Admiral Sir Lewis Clinton-Baker  (16 March 1866 – 12 December 1939) was a Royal Navy officer who served as Commander-in-Chief, East Indies Station.

History 

Clinton-Baker joined the Royal Navy in 1879 He took part in the bombardment of Alexandria in 1882 and went to command HMS Gibraltar during the Second Boer War. He was promoted to Commander on 1 January 1901 and commanded HMS Berwick from 1908.

He served in World War I as Captain of HMS Hercules, which he commanded at the Battle of Jutland in 1916, and then as Captain of HMS Benbow from later that year; he then took responsibility for laying a mine barrage across the North Sea from a base at Grangemouth.

He became Second-in-Command of the Second Battle Squadron in 1919, Admiral Superintendent of Chatham Dockyard in 1920 and Commander-in-Chief, East Indies Station in 1921. In 1925 he was made Admiral commanding the Reserves and in 1927 he retired.

He lived at Bayfordbury in Hertfordshire.

Family
In 1920 he married Rosa Agnes Henderson.

References

1866 births
1939 deaths
Royal Navy admirals
Knights Commander of the Order of the Bath
Knights Commander of the Royal Victorian Order
Commanders of the Order of the British Empire
Royal Navy personnel of the Anglo-Egyptian War
Royal Navy personnel of the Second Boer War
Royal Navy personnel of World War I